CalBank is a commercial bank in Ghana, that is  
licensed by the Bank of Ghana, the central bank and national banking regulator.

Location
The headquarters of CalBank and its main branch are located at 23 Independence Avenue, in the central business district of Accra, the capital of Ghana. The geographical coordinates of the bank's headquarters are:05°33'51.0"N, 0°11'44.0"W (Latitude:5.564167; Longitude:-0.195556).

Overview
Founded in 1990, CalBank is a large financial services retail bank that serves the banking needs of large corporations, high net worth individuals, non-governmental organisations, regular customers and small and medium enterprises. As of December 2020, the bank's assets totaled GHS:7,924,586,000 (US$1.370 billion), with shareholders' equity of GHS:1,132,772,000 (US$195 million).

Ownership
The stock of CalBank is traded on the Ghana Stock Exchange under the symbol CAL. , the stock ownership of the bank is reflected in the table below:

Directors
CalBank is governed by a board of directors, of whom one is an executive director and nine are non-executive. The chairman of the board is Joe Mensah, one of the non-executive directors.

Executive management
Philip Owiredu  is the managing director of CalBank. He is a Fellow of  Chartered Certified Accountants (FCCA). Prior to becoming the managing director at CalBank, he held several managerial positions at the bank, including: (a) financial controller (b) chief financial officer and (c) executive director. Before joining CalBank, Owiredu served as senior manager at KPMG Ghana.

See also
List of banks in Ghana
Economy of Ghana

References

External links
 CAL Bank Homepage

Banks of Ghana
Companies based in Accra
Banks established in 1990
Ghanaian companies established in 1990